Elena Maria del Rocio Padrones Nieto (born 2 May 1973 in Valladolid) is a cyclist from Spain.  She has a vision impairment.  She competed at the 1996 Summer Paralympics. She finished third in the tandem road race.

References

External links 
 
 

1973 births
Living people
Spanish female cyclists
Paralympic cyclists of Spain
Paralympic bronze medalists for Spain
Paralympic medalists in cycling
Cyclists at the 1996 Summer Paralympics
Medalists at the 1996 Summer Paralympics
Cyclists from Castile and León
Sportspeople from Valladolid
20th-century Spanish women